The Guanabara Bay oil spill may be one of three oil spills in Guanabara Bay:

 1975 Guanabara Bay oil spill
 1997 Guanabara Bay oil spill
 2000 Guanabara Bay oil spill